Acacia trachyphloia is a tree native to south eastern Australia. Common names include Bodalla wattle and golden feather wattle. The specific epithet trachyphloia refers to the rough bark.

It grows from 4 to 18 metres tall, found beside streams and other moist areas between Lake Conjola and Bodalla in the south coast region and nearby tablelands of New South Wales. A number of different eucalyptus trees are found nearby. As with many of the acacias, it forms attractive yellow flowers between July and October.

References

trachyphloia
Fabales of Australia
Flora of New South Wales
Trees of Australia